The MTV Video Music Award for Video for Good is an award handed out at the yearly MTV Video Music Awards, first introduced at the 2011 ceremony. Originally named Best Video with a Message, the word "Social" was added to its name in 2013. For the 2017 ceremony the award was renamed Best Fight Against the System while still being known for awarding videos that address current social and political subjects. In 2018, the award's name became Video with a Message, and in 2019, it was changed to its current title.

The first winner of the category was Lady Gaga. As of 2019, John Legend and Big Sean are the biggest winners of the category with two wins, Legend, Taylor Swift and Demi Lovato are the most nominations artist with three in this category.

Recipients

References 

 
MTV Video Music Awards
Awards established in 2011
2011 establishments in the United States